This is the list of artists which used to be signed with Sony BMG - defunct 2008.

For music artists engaged with Sony Music Entertainment

List of Sony BMG artists

A
Aaron Carter
Adam Lambert
Adam Rachel
AC/DC
A. R. Rahman
Aerosmith
Afgan (Indonesia)
Air Supply
Alan Jackson
Alan Parsons Project
Alejandro Fernández (Mexico)
Alexandra Burke
Alice in Chains
Alicia Keys
Alkaline Trio
Aloha from Hell
Acha Septriasa (Indonesia)
Alex Jacobowitz Germany
Alyssa Soebandono (Indonesia)
Amanda Seyfried
Anna Vissi (Greece)
Andity (Indonesia)
Andy Lau (Hong Kong)
Andy Williams
Anna Tatangelo (Italy)
Anggun (Indonesia)
Annie Lennox
Anti-Flag
Antonis Remos (Greece)
Anthony Callea
Amy Pearson
Aram Quartet (Italy)
Aria Wallace (Sony Wonder)
Ariel Rivera (Philippines)
Asia Cruise
Audioslave
Audy (Indonesia)
Avalon Drive
Avril Lavigne (Canada)

B
Backstreet Boys
Baim (Indonesia)
Bebe Rexha
Beyoncé Knowles
Bell Nuntita (Thailand) 
Big Mountain
Billy Joel
Bob Dylan
Bobby Johnson
Boney M.
Bow Wow
Bowling for Soup
Boyzone (Hong Kong)
Brad Paisley
Brian Melo
Brian Tyler (composer)
Brandy
Britney Spears
Big Time Rush
Brooke Barrettsmith
Bruce Springsteen
Bullet for My Valentine

C
Costel Busuioc (Romania)
Chevelle
Caifanes (Mexico)
Caillou (Canada) (Sony Wonder)
Callalily (Philippines)
Calle 13
Calvin Harris
Camila
Carola Häggkvist
Carrie Underwood
Cathy Sharon (Indonesia)
Celine Dion (Canada)
Chad Kroeger (Canada)
Chayanne
Chipmunk (rapper)
Chris Brown
Chris Daughtry
Christina Aguilera
Classified
Ciara
Cindy Yen (Taiwan)
Cinta Laura (Indonesia)
Coheed and Cambria
Colin Farrell (Ireland) (Columbia)
Corbin Bleu (Hollywood)
Courtney Johnson
Cueshé (Philippines)
C:Real
Cyndi Lauper

D
Dan Hartman
Diana Yukawa
Danny Gokey
David Archuleta
David Cook
Dave Matthews Band
David Gilmour
Dead or Alive
Delon (Indonesia)
Delta Goodrem
Diana Vickers  (United Kingdom)
Dido
Dirly Idol (Indonesia)
Dixie Chicks
DMX
Do
Dolla
Donald Duck (Germany, Austria, Swiss,) by Europa (record label) VOOZ Character System and Trickfilmstudio also the Pygos Group 
Duran Duran
Destine
Destiny's Child
Davido (Nigeria)

E
Earth, Wind & Fire
Edward Maya
Elena Paparizou (Greece)
Elli Kokkinou (Greece)
Elvis Presley
El Canto del Loco (Spain)
Eoghan Quigg (United Kingdom)
The Eraserheads (Philippines)
Eros Ramazzotti
Eurythmics
Evan Yo
Evanescence

F
Faye Wong (Hong Kong)
Fey (Mexico)
Fifth harmony
Fireflight
Fiona Apple
Franz Ferdinand
Livvi Franc
The Fray
Foo Fighters
Frances Yip (Hong Kong)
Frank Sinatra

G
Gemelli Diversi
George Michael
George Sampson (United Kingdom)
Gian Magdangal (Philippines)
Gisel Idol (Indonesia)
Gita Gutawa (Indonesia)
Giusy Ferreri
Glenn Miller
Gloria Estefan
Gloria Trevi (Mexico)
Good Charlotte
Good Riddance
Gretchen Espina (Philippines)

H
 Ha*Ash
 H-Blockx
 Howie Day
 The Hoosiers
 Hurts
 Huey, Dewey, and Louie (Europe, South America, Asia) by VOOZ Character System and Trickfilmstudio also the Pygos Group
 Helena Paparizou
 Hayley Warner

I
Ivi Adamou (Greece)
Ihsan Tarore (Indonesia)
Incubus
Indica (Finnish band)
Indonesian Idol (Indonesia)
INXS
Il Divo
Infectious Grooves
Innosense
Insane Clown Posse
Iron Maiden
Itchyworms (Philippines)

J
J-Ax
Jamie Lynn Spears
Jay Chou (Taiwan)
Jasmine Villegas
Jennifer Hudson
Jennifer Lopez
Jeremy Renner (Columbia)
Jessica Mauboy
Jessica Simpson
Jim Jones
JLS (UK)
Joaquín Sabina
Joe Satriani
Jedward
John Mayer
Johnny Cash
Jordin Sparks
Jorge Celedón
Journey
Juice WRLD
Julie Feeney
Julieta Venegas
Justin Timberlake
Jay Sean

K
Kalan Porter
Kaleth Morales (Colombian)
Karen Mok (Hong Kong)
Kat DeLuna
Kaz James (Australia)
KC Concepcion (Philippines)
Keith Whitley
Kelly Clarkson
Kelly Rowland
Kenny Chesney
Kenny Loggins
Kesha
Kings of Leon
Kool Savas
KSI
Kylie Minogue

L
L'Arc-en-Ciel (Japan)
La Diva (Philippines)
La Oreja de Van Gogh (Spain)
La Quinta Estación (Spain)
Lara Liang (Taiwan)
Lea Salonga (Philippines)
LazyTown (German)
Len Carlson (Canada) (Ariola)
Leona Lewis (United Kingdom)
Linda Andrews (Denmark)
Lisa Lougheed (Canada) (Ariola)
Lyfe Jennings
Lordi (Finland)
Los Auténticos Decadentes (Argentina)
Los Fabulosos Cadillacs (Argentina)
Lostprophets (United Kingdom)
Louise Carver
Louis Tomlinson (United Kingdom)
Lovi (Philippines)

M
Martha Heredia
Manchester Orchestra
Marc Anthony
Marco Mengoni
Maria Lawson
Maria Mena
Mariah Carey
Mario
Marvin Gaye
Massari
Mayré Martínez
Melanie Thornton
Mew
Michael Jackson
Michael Magee (Canada) (Ariola)
Michelle Williams
Mika Nakashima (Japan)
Miranda Cosgrove
Misha Omar (Malaysia)
Modern Talking
Monica Arnold
Mónica Naranjo (Spain)
Moonstar88 (Philippines)
Moymoy Palaboy (Philippines)

N
Nâdiya
Natalie Imbruglia (United Kingdom)
Natasha Bedingfield
Neffa (Italy)
Newton Faulkner
New Kids on the Block
Nakaaya Sumari (Tanzania)
Nicola Roberts
Nickelback
'N Sync
Nindy (Indonesia)

O
Oasis
The Offspring
One Direction
OJ
Ozzy Osbourne
Outkast
Outlandish

P
Patti Smith
Paula DeAnda
Paul Potts
Pearl Jam
Pink
Pitbull
Pingu (South Korea) and also VOOZ Character System
Pupil (Philippines)

Q
Qwote

R
Rachel Smith (Indonesia)
Red
Ray Parker Jr.
R. Kelly
Rage Against the Machine
Rainie Yang (Taiwan)
Ricardo Arjona (Guatemala; Mexico)
Rick Astley
Ricky Martin (Puerto Rico)
Rini Idol (Indonesia)
Rivermaya (Philippines)
Robin Beck (Germany) (DSB, Portrait, Reality Entertainment)
Robbie Williams (United Kingdom)
Rogue Traders
Ruby Gloom (Japan) (Sony)
Ruth Lorenzo (United Kingdom)
R.K.M & Ken-Y (Puerto Rico)

S
Samanda
Samantha Jade
Santana
Scouting for Girls
Sean Kingston
Selena Gomez (Malaysia, 2007-2009)
Shakira(Colombia)
Shandy Aulia (Indonesia)
Sharon Jessica (Indonesia)
Sharon Cuneta (Philippines)
SHE Band (Indonesia)
Spandau Ballet (United Kingdom)
Spike (Peanuts character) (Japan) (Epic)
Spiral Starecase
Steps
Simon & Garfunkel
Steve Barakatt
Stevie Wonder
System of a Down
The Strokes
Slayer
Shayne Ward
Suicidal Tendencies
Susan Boyle
Stan Walker

T
Tata Young (Thailand)
Thalía
The Changcuters (Indonesia)
The Fly (Indonesia)
The New Cities
The Script
The Ting Tings
Three Days Grace
Three 6 Mafia
Tommy Kurniawan (Indonesia)
Toni Braxton
T-Pain
Trisha Yearwood

U
Usher

V
Víctor Manuelle
Virginia Maestro (Spain)
VL Mike
Velvet Revolver
Victoria Justice

W
Waldo's People (Finland)
Wayang (Indonesia)
Whitney Houston
"Weird Al" Yankovic
Westlife
Wild Light
Will Smith
Worrawech Danuwong (Thailand)
Wu-Tang Clan

Y
YUI (Japan)
Yuna Ito (Japan)
Yuridia

Z
Zoboomafoo (Canada) (Sony Wonder)

Sony BMG
Sony BMG artists
Sony BMG